Boris Gershevich Moishezon (October 26, 1937 – August 25, 1993) was a Soviet mathematician. He left the Soviet Union in 1972 for Tel Aviv, and in 1977 moved to Columbia University, where he was a professor of mathematics until his death sixteen years later.  He was a Guggenheim Fellow in 1983.

A resident of Leonia, New Jersey, Moishezon died at Holy Name Hospital in Teaneck, New Jersey on August 25, 1993, due to a heart attack he suffered while jogging.

Selected publications

Books

Articles

with Richard Mandelbaum:

See also

 Moishezon manifold
 Nakai–Moishezon criterion

References

Sources

External links
 

Soviet mathematicians
1937 births
1993 deaths
Soviet emigrants to the United States
Columbia University faculty
20th-century American mathematicians
Algebraic geometers
Soviet dissidents
Scientists from Odesa
People from Leonia, New Jersey
Odesa Jews